Lapalisse is a commune in the Allier department, central France. The organist Émile Bourdon (1884–1974) was born in Lapalisse. The 11th century Château de La Palice is located in the commune.

Population

See also
Communes of the Allier department

References

Communes of Allier
Bourbonnais
Allier communes articles needing translation from French Wikipedia